"With a Girl Like You" is a song by English rock band the Troggs, released as a single in July 1966. On the back of the success of "Wild Thing", "With a Girl Like You" topped the charts in the UK, and was similarly a success across Europe, but did not fare as well in the US, only peaking at number 29 on the Billboard Hot 100.

Background and release
"With a Girl Like You" was written by the Troggs' lead vocalist Reg Presley whilst he was a bricklayer. He took inspiration from the vocals in "Barbara Ann", which became a hit for the Beach Boys in early 1966. "With a Girl Like You" was recorded at Olympic Studios at the same time as their previous single "Wild Thing". Both songs were recorded in two takes as they only had a short amount of recording time, as manager Larry Page got them into the studio at the end of a session for his orchestra. The hook, with Presley shouting "Ba ba ba ba ba", was initially planned to be performed on trumpets, though the band opted for vocals instead.

"Wild Thing" had been simultaneously released in the US in May 1966 on two record labels, Atco and Fontana. Atco had released "With a Girl Like You" as the B-side, whereas Fontana released "Wild Thing" with the Presley-penned "From Home". Therefore, in July, Fontana released "With a Girl Like You" as a A-side single with "I Want You", written by Page and Colin Frechter, as the B-side, which is the same as the release in the UK.

Reception
Reviewing for New Musical Express, Derek Johnson wrote that "With a Girl Like You" "doesn't have the novelty spoken passages and tempo breaks of "Wild Thing" but it does have another gimmick – at the end of each line. The soloist repeats the melody in a sort of scat vocal that everyone can join in. It's a catchy mid-tempo tune, fairly simple in construction, and therefore quickly assimilated". Record Mirror wrote that it "should be every bit as big as "Wild Thing"" and similarly that "the boys plunge into a steady mid-tempo, with rasping lead voice, and sturdy beat and several vocal gimmicks on a teen song if ever there was one". Cash Box described it as "a low-down, funky, blues-soaked romancer".

Charts

References

1966 singles
The Troggs songs
Songs written by Reg Presley
1966 songs
Fontana Records singles
UK Singles Chart number-one singles
Dutch Top 40 number-one singles
Number-one singles in New Zealand
Number-one singles in Rhodesia

Number-one singles in South Africa